Artificial nails, also known as fake nails, false nails, acrylic nails, nail extensions or nail enhancements, are extensions placed over fingernails as fashion accessories. Many artificial nail designs attempt to mimic the appearance of real fingernails as closely as possible, while others may deliberately stray in favor of an artistic look.

Artificial nails require regular upkeep; it is recommended that they are attended to, on average, every two weeks, however they may last over one month. Nonetheless, their versatility in terms of shape, size, design and comparatively high durability are some advantages they hold over other types of manicures.

Types 
Artificial nails are an extension, not a replacement, of natural nails. There are two main approaches to creating artificial nails—tips and forms:
 tips are lightweight "nail"-shaped plastic plates glued on the end of the natural nail;
 forms are shaped sheets with a sticky edge that is effectively attached to the tip of the finger and wrapped around the entirety of the nail

Atop these, either acrylic, hard gel, or any combination of both may be applied. Tips are available in many different designs, ranging from solid colors like gel or regular nail polish to graphic designs such as animal prints and metallic colors. Artificial nails can be shaped, cut, and filed into a variety of shapes, including square, squared oval/"squoval", rounded, almond, ballerina/coffin, mountain peak, lipstick, and stiletto.

Acrylic nails 
Acrylic nails are made out of acrylic glass (PMMA). When it is mixed with a liquid monomer (usually ethyl methacrylate mixed with some inhibitor) it forms a malleable bead. This mixture begins to cure immediately, continuing until completely solid in minutes. Acrylic nails can last up to 21 days but can last longer with touch-ups. To give acrylic nails color, gel polish, nail polish, and dip powders can be applied. Use of MMA (Methyl methacrylate liquid monomers) acrylics are strongly discouraged and banned in some states as it can cause damage to the natural nail, asthma; irritated eyes, skin, nose, and mouth; difficulty concentrating; loss of smell and kidney issues. A suitable alternative is EMA (Ethyl Methacrylate Liquid Monomers) in salon use.

Gel nails 

Gel nails can be utilized in order to create artificial nail extensions, but can also be used like nail polish. They are hardened using ultraviolet light. They last longer than regular nail polish and chip less often. They can have a high-gloss finish and last for two to three weeks.

Gel nails are strong, although not as strong as acrylic or fiberglass nails, and tend to be more expensive.

Acetone does not dissolve some types of gel nails, so they have to be removed at a salon by buffing. Repeated buffing can lead to thinning of the nail plate. Improper application of Gel-X can lead to fungal infections and allergic reactions.

A new gel nail extension was created circa 2017 that is commonly referred to as Gel-X. It is a soft gel nail tip that is precut in differing styles and lengths which covers the whole nail bed up to the end of the nail. Gel-X are plied by first applying a PH bonder (dehydrator) followed by an acid-free gel primer. Finally, it is glued on using a gel adhesive that is cured using a blue UV/LED light. The removal process of gel-X nails is dissolving in acetone for 20 minutes.

Nail wraps 
Nail wraps are formed by cutting pieces of fiberglass, linen, silk fabric, or another material to fit on the surface of the nail (or a tip attached prior), to be sealed onto the nail plate with a layer of resin or glue. They do not damage the nail and also provide strength to the nail but are not used to lengthen it. It can also be used to fix broken nails. The treatment is however more expensive. Nail wraps can last anywhere from 5–14 days. Add ons can impact the duration of the nail wraps. To take nail wraps off correctly, soak the wrap in acetone just enough to deteriorate the adhesive.

Nail tips 
Nail tips are made of a strong bendable material called acrylonitrile butadiene styrene (ABS). Nail tips are attached to the natural nail to extend its length and provides room for more nail designs. They can come in many different shapes, sizes, and colors, but the most popular ones are usually clear or white. They only last for 7–10 days.

Dip powder 
With the dip powder method, a clear liquid is brushed onto a nail and the nail is then placed into clear or pigmented powder. Dip nails tend to last about a month, 2–3 weeks longer than gel and acrylic nails. It can be worn on natural nails, nails with tips on, or can create artificial nails. Dip powder nails do not require any UV/LED light to be cured, instead they are cured using an activator. The quickest way to remove dip powder is to drill, clip off, or buff out layers of the powder so, when they are soaking in acetone, they slide right off.

History 
Historically, artificial nails were common symbols of status all across the world:
 During the Ming Dynasty of China, noblewomen wore very long artificial nails as a status symbol indicating that, unlike commoners, they did not have to do manual labor.
 In early 19th century Greece, upper-class women often wore empty pistachio shells over their nails, slowly spreading the artificial nail trend across Europe.
 Egyptian women have made significant strides in elevating their social and economic standing over the past decade. Ancient Egyptian women wore nail extensions made from bone, ivory and gold as a sign of status as these materials were luxuries available only to the wealthy.
"The earliest experiments and resultant artificial nails used a monomer and polymer mix applied to the nail and extended over a supporting form. This structure hardened and, when the support was removed, was then shaped to look like a natural extension of the nail plate. These dental materials were chemicals that came under the 'family' name of acrylics: thus the acrylic artificial nail was created. All materials subsequently used also belong to the acrylic family, but the term 'acrylic nails' has stuck to the method of using a liquid monomer and powder polymer."

In 1878, Mary E. Cobb opened the first manicure salon in Manhattan. This came after studying nail care in France and marrying podiatrist, J. Parker Pray. During the 1920s, short well-manicured round nails were a symbol of wealth. Revlon made their first appearance in 1932 with only one single product, long lasting formula nail enamel. In 1954, Fred Slack, a dentist, broke his fingernail at work, and created an artificial nail as a realistic-looking temporary replacement. After experiments with different materials to perfect his invention, he and his brother, Tom, patented a successful version and started the company Patti Nails. Fred Slack used his dental equipment and chemicals to replace his natural nail, but over time the process has significantly changed.

In the late 20th century, artificial nails for women became widely popular all over the world. In today's time there are even nail styling competitions. Judges of these nail competitions look for consistency from nail to nail. They also judge whether or not the nails complement the model's hands. If the nails are beautiful, but too long for the model's hands, the judge will count off points. The competitors will be judged on how neat their work space is and how organized they are.

For years, nails were worn mostly by women. Now, in present days, people of all genders have the opportunity to wear false nails.

Health effects

Perceived benefits
Acrylic nails help conceal or fix broken, damaged, short, or otherwise considered "undesirable" nail appearance. They also help prevent nail biting, breakage, and splits. They are used when people are not able to grow the length and strength of natural nails that they desire or simply desire a new fashion look. This problem can be solved by using certain nail techniques such as nail tipping, sculptured nails, nail wrapping, or acrylic overlays. With improper removal, acrylic nails often damage natural nails. An experienced nail technician should assist with this to ensure nail health.

Health risks
If fitted properly, artificial nails are usually not problematic. However, long term use and poorly fitted nails can seriously damage the nail bed and hamper natural nail growth. The most common problem associated with artificial nails is a fungal infection that may develop between the false and natural nail.

When artificial nails are applied to the natural nail surface, minor types of trauma to the artificial nails which can happen from something as harmless as scraping or bumping a nail against a firm surface can cause separation of the nail from its nail bed. This allows bacteria and fungus to potentially enter the separated area setting up an infection and bacterial burden. Many hospitals and healthcare facilities don't allow employees to have long fingernails, fake or real, due to the risk of said nails harboring microbes that could transmit diseases to patients. Infection can also be a risk when nails are applied by a disreputable nail salon that doesn't follow sanitary practices.

From an occupational health standpoint, there could be hazards to nail salon workers who are exposed to the chemical fumes from artificial nails during their entire work shift. Ethyl methacrylate can be used for artificial nails and can cause contact dermatitis, asthma, and allergies in the eyes and nose. Nail salon workers also face exposure to other chemicals used, such as toluene, dibutyl phthalate, and formaldehyde. The products used to make acrylic nails may also be flammable.

Exposure to methyl methacrylate (the precursor to acrylic glass) can cause drowsiness, light-headedness, and trembling of the hands, and so it has been banned for use in cosmetology in the majority of US states. Some signs that a nail salon is still using MMA might be prices that are significantly lower than most other nail salons. There will be an unusually strong and fruity odor. Also, the manicurist will often be wearing a mask to keep from breathing in the harmful chemical. Removal is much more difficult, and drills are more excessively used.

See also 
 Fingerpick, placed on fingers to play stringed instruments

Further reading 
 Chase, Deborah. The New Medically Based No-Nonsense Beauty Book. Henry Holt and Company, Inc., 1989.
 Schoon, Douglas D. Nail Structure and Product Chemistry. Milady Publishing, 1996.
 Symington, Jan. Australian nail technology. Tertiary Press, 2006.
 Anthony, Elizabeth. "ABC's of Acrylics," NailPro Magazine, October 1994.
 Hamacker, Amy. "Dental Adhesives for Nails," NailPro Magazine, June 1994.

References

Nail care
Artificial objects